In Islam, Taqiya or  Taqiyya (literally "prudence, fear") is a precautionary dissimulation or denial of religious belief and practice. Generally, taqiya is the action of committing a sinful act (such as feigning unbelief) for a pious goal.

A related term is Kitmān (lit. "action of covering, dissimulation"), which has a more specific meaning of dissimulation by silence or omission.

This practice is emphasized in Shi'ism whereby adherents are permitted to conceal their religion when under threat of persecution or compulsion. 

Taqiyya was initially practiced under duress by some of Muhammad's companions. Later, it became particularly important for Shias due to their experience as a persecuted religious minority. According to Shia doctrine, taqiyya is permissible in situations where there is overwhelming danger of loss of life or property and where no danger to religion would occur thereby. Taqiyya has also been politically legitimised, particularly among Twelver Shias, in order to maintain unity among Muslims and fraternity among the Shia clerics.

Yarden Mariuma, sociologist at Columbia University, writes: "Taqiyya is an Islamic juridical term whose shifting meaning relates to when a Muslim is allowed, under Sharia law, to lie. A concept whose meaning has varied significantly among Islamic sects, scholars, countries, and political regimes, it nevertheless is one of the key terms used by recent anti-Muslim polemicists."

Etymology and related terms

Taqiyya
The term taqiyya ( /) is derived from the Arabic triliteral root wāw-qāf-yā, literally denoting "caution, fear", "prudence, guarding against (a danger)", "carefulness, wariness". In the sense of "prudence, fear" it can be used synonymously with the terms tuqa(n), tuqāt, taqwā and ittiqāʾ, derived from the same root. These terms also have other meanings. For example, the term taqwa generally means "piety" (lit. "fear [of God]") in an Islamic context.

Kitmān 
A related term is kitmān– the "action of covering, dissimulation". While the terms taqiyya and kitmān may be used synonymously, kitmān refers specifically to the concealment of one's convictions by silence or omission. Kitman derives from the Arabic word 'katama', which is defined as, 'to conceal, to hide'. The Ibadi Muslims used kitmān to conceal their Muslim beliefs in the face of persecution by their enemies.

Quranic basis
The technical meaning of the term taqiyya is thought to be derived from the Quranic reference to religious dissimulation in Sura 3:28:

The two words tattaqū ("you fear") and tuqāt "in fear" are derived from the same root as taqiya, and use of the abstract noun taqiya in reference to the general principle described in this passage is first recorded in a Qur'anic gloss by Al-Bukhari (9th century).

Regarding 3:28, Ibn Kathir writes, "meaning, except those believers who in some areas or times fear for their safety from the disbelievers. In this case, such believers are allowed to show friendship to the disbelievers outwardly, but never inwardly." He quotes Muhammad's companion, Abu Ad-Darda', who said "we smile in the face of some people although our hearts curse them," and Al-Hasan who said "the Tuqyah is acceptable till the Day of Resurrection."

A similar instance of the Qur'an permitting dissimulation under compulsion is found in Sura 16:106.
Sunni and Shia commentators alike observe that verse 16:106 refers to the case of 'Ammar b. Yasir, who was forced to renounce his beliefs under physical duress and torture.

Sunni Islam view

The basic principle of taqiyya is agreed upon by scholars, though they tend to restrict it to dealing with non-Muslims and when under compulsion (ikrāh), while Shia jurists also allow it in interactions with Muslims and in all necessary matters (ḍarūriyāt). In Sunni jurisprudence protecting one's belief during extreme or exigent circumstances is called idtirar, which translates to "being forced" or "being coerced", and this word is not specific to concealing the faith; for example, under the jurisprudence of idtirar one is allowed to consume prohibited food (e.g. pork) to avoid starving to death. Additionally, denying one's faith under duress is "only at most permitted and not under all circumstances obligatory". Al-Tabari comments on sura XVI, verse 106 (Tafsir, Bulak 1323, xxiv, 122): "If any one is compelled and professes unbelief with his tongue, while his heart contradicts him, in order to escape his enemies, no blame falls on him, because God takes his servants as their hearts believe." This verse was recorded after Ammar Yasir was forced by the idolaters of Mecca to recant his faith and denounce the Islamic prophet Muhammad. Al-Tabari explains that concealing one's faith is only justified if the person is in mortal danger, and even then martyrdom is considered a noble alternative. If threatened, it would be preferable for a Muslim to migrate to a more peaceful place where a person may practice their faith openly, "since God's earth is wide." In Hadith, in the Sunni commentary of Sahih al-Bukhari, known as the Fath al-Bari, it is stated that:
Which translates to:  

Al-Ghazali wrote in his The Revival of the Religious Sciences: 

Ibn Sa'd, in his book al-Tabaqat al-Kubra, narrates on the authority of Ibn Sirin:

Jalal al-Din al-Suyuti, in his book al-Ashbah Wa al-Naza'ir, affirms that:

Jalal al-Din al-Suyuti, in his book al-Durr al-Manthoor Fi al-Tafsir al- Ma'athoor, narrates that:

Examples

When Mamun became caliph (813 AD), he tried to impose his religious views on the status of the Qur'an over all his subjects, in an ordeal called the mihna, or "inquisition". His views were disputed, and many of those who refused to follow his views were imprisoned, tortured, or threatened with the sword. Some Sunni scholars chose to affirm Mamun's view that the Qur'an was created, in spite of their beliefs, though a notable exception to this was scholar and theologian Ahmad ibn Hanbal, who chose to endure torture rather than to lie.

Following the end of the Reconquista of the Iberian Peninsula in 1492, Muslims were persecuted by the Catholic Monarchs and forced to convert to Christianity or face expulsion. The principle of taqiyya became very important for Muslims during the Inquisition in 16th-century Spain, as it allowed them to convert to Christianity while remaining crypto-Muslims, practicing Islam in secret. In 1504, Ubayd Allah al-Wahrani, a Maliki mufti in Oran, issued a fatwā allowing Muslims to make extensive use of concealment to maintain their faith. This is seen as an exceptional case, since Islamic law prohibits conversion except in cases of mortal danger, and even then requires recantation as quickly as possible, and al-Wahrani's reasoning diverged from that of the majority of earlier Maliki Faqīhs such as Al-Wansharisi.

Shia Islam view
Minority Shi‘a communities, since the earliest days of Islam, were often forced to practice pious circumspection (taqiyya) as an instinctive method of self-preservation and protection, an obligatory practice in the lands which became known as the realm of pious circumspection (dār al-taqiyya).

Two primary aspects of circumspection became central for the Shi‘a: not disclosing their association with the Imams when this could put them in danger and protecting the esoteric teachings of the Imams from those who are unprepared to receive them. While in most instances, minority Shi‘a communities employed taqiyya using the façade of Sunnism in Sunni-dominated societies, the principle also allows for circumspection as other faiths. For instance, Gupti Ismaili Shi‘a communities in the Indian subcontinent circumspect as Hindus to avoid caste persecution. In many cases, the practice of taqiyya became deeply ingrained into practitioners’ psyche. If a believer wished, he/she could adopt this practice at moments of danger, or as a lifelong process.

Twelver Shia view
The doctrine of taqiyya was developed at the time of Ja'far al-Sadiq (d. 148 AH/765 AD), the sixth Imamiya Imam. It served to protect Shias when Al-Mansur (r. 754–775), the Abbasid caliph, conducted a brutal and oppressive campaign against Alids and their supporters. Religious dissimulation or Taqiyya while maintaining mental reservation is considered lawful in Shi'ism "in situations where there is overwhelming danger of loss of life or property and where no danger to religion would occur thereby". Shi'is lived mostly as a minority among a frequently-hostile Sunni majority until the rise of Safavid dynasty. This condition made taqiyya doctrine important to Shias.

Taqiyya holds a central place in Twelver Shia Islam. This is sometimes explained by the minority position Shias had under the political dominance of Sunni Muslims, requiring them to protect themselves through concealment and dissimulation. In Shia legal literature, there is a range of situations in which taqiyya may be used or even required. For Shia Muslims, taqiyya is to conceal their association with their faith when revealing it would result in danger. Taqiyya is done for reasons of safety. For example, a person may fear that he might be killed or harmed if he does not observe taqiyya. In this case, taqiyya is allowed. However, in some circumstances taqiyya may lead to the death of an innocent person; if so, it is not permissible; it is haraam (forbidden) to kill a human being to save one's own life. Some Shias, though, advance taqiyya as a form of jihad, a sort of fighting against their adversaries.

Others relate it to the esoteric nature of early Shia Islam. The knowledge (‘Ilm) given to the Imams by God had to be protected and the truth would have to be hidden before the uninitiated or their adversaries until the coming of the Twelfth Imam, when this knowledge and ultimate meaning can become known to everyone.

Religious rulings of the Shia Imams were also influenced by taqiyya. Some of the traditions from the Imams make taqiyya a central element of Shiism: "He who has no taqiyya has no faith"; "he who forsakes taqiyya is like him who forsakes prayer"; "taqiyya is the believers shield, but for taqiyya, God would not have been worshipped". It is unclear whether those traditions only refer to taqiyya under risk or also taqiyya to conceal the esoteric doctrines of Shiism. Many Shias today deny that taqiyya has any significance in their religion.

Ismaili Shia view

For the Ismailis in the aftermath of the Mongol onslaught of the Alamut state in 1256 CE, the need to practice taqiyya became necessary, not only for the protection of the community itself, which was now stateless, but also for safeguarding the line of the Nizari Ismaili Imamate during this period of unrest. Accordingly, the Shia Imam Ja'far al-Sadiq stated "Taqiyya is my religion and the religion of my ancestors", a tradition recorded in various sources including Kitāb al-Maḥāsin of Aḥmad b. Muhammad al-Barqī and the Da‘ā’im al-Islām of al-Qāḍī al-Nu‘mān. Such periods in which the Imams are concealed are known as satr, however the term may also refer to times when the Imams were not physically hidden from view but rather when the community was required to practice precautionary dissimulation. During satr the Imam could only be accessed by his community and in extremely dangerous circumstances, would be accessible only to the highest-ranking members of the Ismaili hierarchy (ḥudūd), whose function it was to transmit the teachings of the Imam to the community. Shı’a Imam Ja’far al-S.adiq is reputed to have said, "Our teaching is the truth, the truth of the truth; it is the exoteric and the esoteric, and the esoteric of the esoteric; it is the secret and the secret of a secret, a protected secret, hidden by a secret." The Fatimid Imam-Caliph al-Hakim expresses the sentiment of taqiyya when he confides to his followers that "if any religion is stronger than you, follow it, but keep me in your hearts."

According to Shia scholar Muhammad Husain Javari Sabinal, Shiism would not have spread at all if not for taqiyya, referring to instances where Shia have been ruthlessly persecuted by the Sunni political elite during the Umayyad and Abbasid empires. Indeed, for the Ismailis, the persistence and prosperity of the community today owes largely to the careful safeguarding of the beliefs and teachings of the Imams during the Ilkhanate, the Safawid dynasty, and other periods of persecution.  The 16th century Ismaili author Khwāja Muḥammad Riḍā b. Sulṭān Ḥusayn, also known as Khayrkhvah-i Harati, referring to the Anjudan period, writes about the end of an era of taqiyya. He explains that thus far "a veil was drawn over the visage of truth," but now the Imam "allowed the veil to be lifted". Since the Imam had allowed written correspondence with his followers, he had effectively ended the era of taqiyya.

The Gupti community viewed the Aga Khan III as their spiritual leader and Imam, but concealed these beliefs to protect themselves. However, the Guptis used a unique form of taqiyya, they did not appear as Sunni, Sufi, or Ithna ashari, which were the more common identities to take on. Rather they identified as Hindus, and this  became a significant aspect of who they were. The Guptis view their taqiyya as a fulfillment and culmination of their outwardly professed faith, rather than contrary to it. The name ‘Gupta’ in Sanskrit, means secret or hidden, which perfectly embodies the concealment of their faith and true identity.

Alawite view
Alawites beliefs have never been confirmed by their modern religious authorities. Alawites tend to conceal their beliefs (taqiyya) due to historical persecution. Some tenets of the faith are secret, known only to a select few; therefore, they have been described as a mystical sect. Alawites celebrate Islamic festivals but consider the most important one to be Eid al-Ghadir.

Druze view
Because of the Druze's Ismaili Shia origin, they have also been associated with taqiyya. When the Druze were a minority being persecuted they took the appearance of another religion externally, usually the ruling religion in the area, and for the most part adhered to Muslim customs by this practice.

Contemporary debate
In the early 21st century, taqiyya has become the subject of debate. According to S. Jonathon O'Donnell, some theories posit "the idea that Muslims have a religious duty to deceive non-Muslims if it furthers the cause" of Islam. He argues the "claim rests on a misreading of the concept of taqiyya, by which believers may conceal their faith if under threat of violence. This misreading is widely deployed in Islamophobic writings." The term has been used by writers and counter-jihadists such as Patrick Sookhdeo, who posit that Muslims use the doctrine as a key strategy in the Islamization of Western countries by hiding their true violent intents.

In 2008 Raymond Ibrahim published in Jane's Islamic Affairs Analyst an article titled "Islam's doctrines of deception". Ibrahim presented his own translation of part of Lebanese Druze scholar Sami Makarem's monograph Al Taqiyya Fi Al Islam ("Dissimulation in Islam"). Ibrahim quoted:

Michael Ryan, also in Jane's, characterized Ibrahim's article as "well-researched, factual in places but ... ultimately misleading". Ibrahim responded in 2009 with "Taqiyya Revisited: A Response to the Critics", on his blog and on the Middle East Forum website. Ibrahim was again criticised for his view on Taqiya in 2019, by Islamic scholar Usama Hasan in the Jewish Chronicle.  Ibrahim also responded to Hasan in a FrontPage Magazine article titled "Taqiyya Sunset: Exposing the Darkness Shrouding Islamic Deceit."

Stefan Wimmer argues that taqiyya is not a tool to deceive non-Muslims and spread Islam, but instead a defensive mechanism to save one's life when it is in great danger (giving the example of the Reconquista). Similar views are shown by Jakob Skovgaard-Petersen from the University of Copenhagen.

See also

 Criticism of Twelver Shia Islam
 Crypto-Christianity
 Crypto-Islam
 Crypto-Judaism
 Denial of Peter
 Doctrine of mental reservation
 Islamic schools and branches
 Religious views on truth
 Mental reservation
 Munafiq
 Self-sacrifice in Jewish law

References

Further reading
Bar-Asher, Me'ir Mikha'el (1999). Scripture and Exegesis in Early Imami Shiism. Brill Academic Publishers. 
Cook, Michael (2003). Early Muslim Dogma: A Source-Critical Study. Cambridge University Press. 
Daftary, Farhad (1992). The Isma'ilis: Their History and Doctrines. Cambridge University Press. 
Goldziher, I., Das Prinzip der takijja im Islam, ZMLG 60 (1906), 213–226.
Emadi, Hafizullah (1998). The end of taqiyya: reaffirming the religious identity of Ismailis in Shughnan, Badakhshan – political implications for Afghanistan. Middle Eastern Studies. 34(3): 103–120.
Emadi, Hafizullah (2000). Praxis of taqiyya: perseverance of Pashaye Ismaili enclave, Nangarhar, Afghanistan. Central Asian Survey. 19(2): 253–264.
Firro, Kais (1999). The Druzes in the Jewish State: A Brief History. Brill Academic Publishers. 
Gleave, Robert (2000). Inevitable Doubt. Two Theories of Shi'i Jurisprudence. Brill Academic Publishers. 

Misri, Ahmad ibn Naqib al- (1997). The Reliance of the Traveler, translated by Nuh Ha Mim Keller, Amana Publications.
Makarem, Sami (2004). Al-Taqiyya Fi Al-Islam (Dissimulation in Islam), Druze Heritage Foundation.  (in Arabic)

External links

"al-Taqiyya/Dissimulation" (Part I, Part II, Part III), A Shi'ite Encyclopedia

Arabic words and phrases
Arabic words and phrases in Sharia
Counter-jihad
Crypto-Islam
Islam-related controversies
Islamic terminology
Ismaili theology
Sharia legal terminology
Shia theology